HMS Ibis, pennant number U99, was a  sloop of the Royal Navy, named after the Ibis.

She was built by Furness Shipbuilding Co. Ltd., Haverton Hill-on-Tees, Co. Durham, was laid down on 22 September 1939, launched on 28 November 1940, and completed 30 August 1941. She was adopted by the civil community of Stoke Newington in London as part of the Warship Week savings campaign in 1942.

Ibis was sunk by an airborne torpedo from an Italian aircraft in the Western Mediterranean, north of Algiers, French Algeria, on 10 November 1942.

The Scottish comedian Rikki Fulton was a member of her crew.

Notes

Publications
 
 
Hughes, Robert (1975). Flagship to Murmansk. London, England: Future Publications. ISBN 0860072665. Pages 83–6 give an account of the sinking of the Ibis and the rescue of survivors as seen by HMS Scylla.

 

Ships built on the River Tees
Black Swan-class sloops
World War II sloops of the United Kingdom
Sloops of the United Kingdom
World War II shipwrecks in the Mediterranean Sea
Ships sunk by Italian aircraft
1940 ships
Maritime incidents in November 1942